The 44th Cuban National Series was won by Santiago de Cuba over Havana. Industriales, who had the best regular season record, were eliminated in the first round by Sancti Spíritus.

Regular season standings

Western zone

Eastern zone

Playoffs

References
 passim

Cuban National Series seasons
Base
Base
Cuba